The Tour of Misia 2008 Eighth World was the thirteenth concert tour by Japanese recording artist Misia, in support of her album Eighth World (2008). Comprising a set list of songs from Eighth World and previous albums, the tour visited arenas nationwide and spanned three months. The Tour of Misia 2008 Eighth World was simultaneously announced with Misia's Hoshizora no Live IV Classics summer tour in April 2007. The tour commenced in late December 2006 and concluded in late February 2007. Initially scheduled to run for eleven shows, an additional date at the Yokohama Arena venue was added as the final show. Sponsored by OCN, the tour drew an estimated audience of 150,000.

On January 10, 2008, it was announced that Misia was suffering from acute tonsillitis. Despite cancelling the promotional campaign for Eighth World, she recovered on time for the January 19 show.

A wrap party titled The Tour of Misia 2008 Eighth World Cocktail Party was held two days after the conclusion of the tour at the ageHa nightclub. WOWOW aired a TV edit of The Tour of Misia 2008 Eighth World on April 15, 2008.

Setlist

Tour dates

Personnel 

Keyboards – Tohru Shigemi
Drums – Jun Aoyama
Guitar – Kenji Suzuki
Bass – Takeshi Taneda
DJ – Ta–Shi
Manipulator – Go Sudo
Dancer(s) – Stezo, U-Ge, Michie, Hyrossi, Takuya, Hiro, Yoshie, Tatsuo, Medusa, Akko
Executive Producer – Hiroto Tanigawa
Production Producer – Kazuhiko Igarashi
Sound Planner – Keiji Shigeta
Lighting Planner – Ikuo Ogawa
Lighting Operator(s) – Masaaki Takahashi, Yasuhiro Komukai, Maki Morita, Shihou Takahashi, Makoto Setoyama, Noriko Morimoto, Mizoo Mitsunaga
Lighting Effect Planner – Seiichi Tozuka
Lighting Effect Operator(s) – Hiroyuki Koike, Tetsuya Oki, Mami Sato
Special Effect Planner – Takeshi Hagino
Special Effect Operator – Kanako Chiba
Set Design – Yukako Arai
Set Direction – Chihiro Natori, Hiromi Shibata, Teruhiko Kuroki
Stage Manager(s) – Shuichi Majima, Ryoko Tsukahara, Mitsuru Morita, Arata Shimizu
Art Director – Mitsuo Shindo
Inferno Artist – Shinichi Ishikawa
PA Operator(s) – Takashi Mitsui, Miyuki Tsuzuki, Tomonori Yasui, Kazuharu Takise, Joji Fukumoto, Yuta Koga
Equipment Technician(s) – Kazuyuki Okada, Keiji Tateishi, Kazuya Takahashi, Satsuki Hosomi, Hiroshi Yamane
Power Supply Operator – Naotaka Tanimura

Balloon – Minoru Osada
Visual System – Yasuhiro Shimizu, Ryuta Honma
Visual System Producer – Atsuki Yukawa
Visual System Production Manager(s) – Soyogi Sugiura, Shinichi "Sam" Kawase
Visual System Designer – Rie Kategawa
Computational Graphic – Yutaro Amano
"Ishin Denshin" Character Designer – Keiji Yanobe
Flying System – Yoshihiko Tanaka, Hiromasa Echigo, Satoru Inagaki, Yusuke Nakamura, Takeshi Iwamoto, Toshisue Kubo
Wardrobe – Erina Ishihara, Yumiko Otsuka, Azusa Shibata
Transporter(s) – Setsuo Noto, Miwa Morioka
Band Manager – Mari Koda
Dancer Manager – Hiroaki Kusano
Band & Dancer Costume Director – Mitsuru Kurosawa
Dancer Trainer(s) – Yukinori Narushima, Takayuki Yumioka, Kayoko Nakagawa
Merchandiser(s) – Keisuke Sato, Hiroshi Suzuki
Costume Director – Sakae Kaneda
Make Up – Kaori Kasso
Hair – Yukimi Ueda
Artist Manager(s) – Toshiyuki Kimura, Rui Nishikawa
Artist Food Coordinator – Masashi Mizukoshi
Club Msa – Saori Sonoda, Kyosuke Ogata, Tsutomu Yamashiro, Hiroko Goto
Tour Coordination Assistant(s) – Kumiko Ohata, Kimie Ikeda
Promoter(s) – Kyodo Osaka, Kyodo Nishinippon, Sundayfolk Promotion, Disk Garage
Production Manager(s) – Chihiro Iwasaki, Hiroyuki Hagiwara

Credits and personnel as per The Tour of Misia 2008 Eighth World concert DVD.

References

External links
 

2007 concert tours
2008 concert tours
Misia concert tours
Albums recorded at the Yokohama Arena